Yevgeny Burmatnov (born 19 April 1966) is a Russian sailor. He competed at the 1992 Summer Olympics and the 1996 Summer Olympics.

References

External links
 

1966 births
Living people
Russian male sailors (sport)
Olympic sailors of the Unified Team
Olympic sailors of Russia
Sailors at the 1992 Summer Olympics – 470
Sailors at the 1996 Summer Olympics – 470
Place of birth missing (living people)